Menglunia is a monotypic genus of Asian ray spiders containing the single species, Menglunia inaffecta. It was first described by Q. Y. Zhao & S. Q. Li in 2012, and is found in China.

See also
 List of Theridiosomatidae species

References

Monotypic Araneomorphae genera
Spiders of China
Theridiosomatidae